Changureh or Changurah or Changoreh and Changurakh may refer to:

 Changureh, Avaj
 Changureh, Takestan